René Lefèvre was a French journalist who joined the satirical newspaper Canard enchaîné at the time of the Algerian War. In 1958, at Lefèvre's instigation, the paper created a special prize for Bernard Clavel, for his early novel Qui m’emporte. The prize, called Prix des Petits Pères (Prize of the Little Fathers), marked the first time that Clavel came to the attention of the French literary establishment.

Sources
Clavel, Bernard and Rivard, Adéline. Bernard Clavel, qui êtes-vous?, J'ai lu, 1985, p. 84.  
Martin, Laurent. Le Canard enchaîné, ou, Les fortunes de la vertu: histoire d'un journal satirique, 1915-2000. Flammarion, 2001, p. 305. 

French reporters and correspondents
Living people
French journalists
French male non-fiction writers
Year of birth missing (living people)